Caroline Carver may refer to:

 Caroline Carver (author) (born 1959), crime author
 Caroline Carver (actress) (born 1976), English actress